La Voz (season 2) is an ongoing Spanish reality talent show that premiered on 16 September 2013 on Telecinco. Based on the reality singing competition The Voice of Holland, the series was created by Dutch television producer John de Mol. It is part of an international series.

Melendi left the show, being replaced by Antonio Orozco. David Bisbal, Rosario Flores and Malú continued as coaches. Jesús Vázquez and Tania Llasera remained as the host and the social media correspondent respectively.

Stage 1: "Audiciones a ciegas" (Blind Auditions) 
The Blind Auditions were taped in July 2013 and aired from 16 September to 21 October 2013 in six telecasts.  95 auditioners took part in the Blind Auditions. Each coach had to form a team of 16 contestants.

Episode 1: 16 September 2013 
The first episode began with the four coaches singing a medley of "Qué bonito", "Vuelvo a verte", "Dígale" and "No hay más".

Episode 2: 23 September 2013

Episode 3: 30 September 2013

Episode 4: 7 October 2013

Episode 5: 14 October 2013

Episode 6: 21 October 2013

Stage 2: "Las Batallas" (The Battles) 
The battle rounds were broadcast from 28 October to 11 November. 'Steals' were introduced this season, where each coach could steal two contestants from another team when they lost their battle round. The advisers for the battles are: Juan Magán working with Antonio Orozco; Cali & El Dandee helping David Bisbal; Carlos Vives accompanying Malú; and Coti joining Rosario.

Color key

Ratings

References 

Spain
2013 Spanish television seasons